Protopop Jovan is the Serbian-language rendition of "Protopope John". It may refer to:

Jovan the Serb of Kratovo (1526–1583), Serbian Orthodox priest and scribe with an opus of six works, of which one is the Velika Remeta Gospel (1580)
Jovan Pavlović (?), Serbian Orthodox priest of Šabac

See also
Jovan (given name)
Protopop